The following is a listing of affiliates for Antenna TV, a classic television network, which was launched on January 1, 2011.  This is a listing of Antenna TV's confirmed affiliates, arranged by U.S. state. There are links to and articles on each of the stations, describing their local programming, hosts and technical information, such as broadcast frequencies. In most markets, Antenna TV operates on a digital subchannel of the main station listed.

Stations that are BOLD are Antenna TV Owned and Operated.

Current affiliates

References

External links
 Official list of Antenna TV affiliates

Antenna TV